The Mesozoic Era is the second-to-last era of Earth's geological history, lasting from about , comprising the Triassic, Jurassic and Cretaceous Periods. It is characterized by the dominance of archosaurian reptiles, like the dinosaurs; an abundance of conifers and ferns; a hot greenhouse climate; and the tectonic break-up of Pangaea. The Mesozoic is the middle of the three eras since complex life evolved: the Paleozoic, the Mesozoic, and the Cenozoic.

The era began in the wake of the Permian–Triassic extinction event, the largest well-documented mass extinction in Earth's history, and ended with the Cretaceous–Paleogene extinction event, another mass extinction whose victims included the non-avian dinosaurs, pterosaurs, mosasaurs, and plesiosaurs. The Mesozoic was a time of significant tectonic, climatic, and evolutionary activity. The era witnessed the gradual rifting of the supercontinent Pangaea into separate landmasses that would move into their current positions during the next era. The climate of the Mesozoic was varied, alternating between warming and cooling periods. Overall, however, the Earth was hotter than it is today. Dinosaurs first appeared in the Mid-Triassic, and became the dominant terrestrial vertebrates in the Late Triassic or Early Jurassic, occupying this position for about 150 or 135 million years until their demise at the end of the Cretaceous. Archaic birds appeared in the Jurassic, having evolved from a branch of theropod dinosaurs, then true toothless birds appeared in the Cretaceous. The first mammals also appeared during the Mesozoic, but would remain small—less than 15 kg (33 lb)—until the Cenozoic. The flowering plants appeared in the early Cretaceous Period and would rapidly diversify throughout the end of the era, replacing conifers and other gymnosperms as the dominant group of plants.

Naming 
The phrase "Age of Reptiles" was introduced by the 19th century paleontologist Gideon Mantell who viewed it as dominated by diapsids such as Iguanodon, Megalosaurus, Plesiosaurus, and Pterodactylus.

The current name was proposed in 1840 by the British geologist John Phillips (1800–1874). In this way, the Mesozoic is comparable to the Cenozoic and Paleozoic ('old life') Eras as well as the Proterozoic ('earlier life') Eon.

The Mesozoic Era was originally described as the "secondary" era, following the "primary" (Paleozoic), and preceding the Tertiary.

Geologic periods
Following the Paleozoic, the Mesozoic extended roughly 186 million years, from  when the Cenozoic Era began. This time frame is separated into three geologic periods. From oldest to youngest:
 Triassic
 Jurassic
 Cretaceous

The lower boundary of the Mesozoic is set by the Permian–Triassic extinction event, during which it has been estimated that up to 90-96% of marine species became extinct although those approximations have been brought into question with some paleontologists estimating the actual numbers as low as 81%. It is also known as the "Great Dying" because it is considered the largest mass extinction in the Earth's history. The upper boundary of the Mesozoic is set at the Cretaceous–Paleogene extinction event (or K–Pg extinction event), which may have been caused by an asteroid impactor that created Chicxulub Crater on the Yucatán Peninsula. Towards the Late Cretaceous, large volcanic eruptions are also believed to have contributed to the Cretaceous–Paleogene extinction event. Approximately 50% of all genera became extinct, including all of the non-avian dinosaurs.

Triassic
The Triassic ranges roughly from 252 million to 201 million years ago, preceding the Jurassic Period. The period is bracketed between the Permian–Triassic extinction event and the Triassic–Jurassic extinction event, two of the "big five", and it is divided into three major epochs: Early, Middle, and Late Triassic.

The Early Triassic, about 252 to 247 million years ago, was dominated by deserts in the interior of the Pangaea supercontinent. The Earth had just witnessed a massive die-off in which 95% of all life became extinct, and the most common vertebrate life on land were Lystrosaurus, labyrinthodonts, and Euparkeria along with many other creatures that managed to survive the Permian extinction. Temnospondyls reached peak diversity during the early Triassic. 

The Middle Triassic, from 247 to 237 million years ago, featured the beginnings of the breakup of Pangaea and the opening of the Tethys Ocean. Ecosystems had recovered from the Permian extinction. Algae, sponge, corals, and crustaceans all had recovered, and new aquatic reptiles evolved, such as ichthyosaurs and nothosaurs. On land, pine forests flourished, as did groups of insects like mosquitoes and fruit flies. Reptiles began to get bigger and bigger, and the first crocodilians and dinosaurs evolved, which sparked competition with the large amphibians that had previously ruled the freshwater world, respectively mammal-like reptiles on land.

Following the bloom of the Middle Triassic, the Late Triassic, from 237 to 201 million years ago, featured frequent heat spells and moderate precipitation (10–20 inches per year). The recent warming led to a boom of dinosaurian evolution on land as those one began to separate from each other (Nyasasaurus from 243 to 210 million years ago, approximately 235–30 ma, some of them separated into Sauropodomorphs, Theropods and Herrerasaurids), as well as the first pterosaurs. During the Late Triassic, some advanced cynodonts gave rise to the first Mammaliaformes. All this climatic change, however, resulted in a large die-out known as the Triassic–Jurassic extinction event, in which many archosaurs (excluding pterosaurs, dinosaurs and crocodylomorphs), most synapsids, and almost all large amphibians became extinct, as well as 34% of marine life, in the Earth's fourth mass extinction event. The cause is debatable; flood basalt eruptions at the Central Atlantic magmatic province is cited as one possible cause.

Jurassic
The Jurassic ranges from 200 million years to 145 million years ago and features three major epochs: The Early Jurassic, the Middle Jurassic, and the Late Jurassic.

The Early Jurassic spans from 200 to 175 million years ago. The climate was tropical and much more humid than the Triassic, as a result of the large seas appearing between the land masses. In the oceans, plesiosaurs, ichthyosaurs and ammonites were abundant. On land, dinosaurs and other archosaurs staked their claim as the dominant race, with theropods such as Dilophosaurus at the top of the food chain. The first true crocodiles evolved, pushing the large amphibians to near extinction. All-in-all, archosaurs rose to rule the world. Meanwhile, the first true mammals evolved, remaining relatively small but spreading widely; the Jurassic Castorocauda, for example, had adaptations for swimming, digging and catching fish. Fruitafossor, from the late Jurassic Period about 150 million years ago, was about the size of a chipmunk, and its teeth, forelimbs and back suggest that it dug open the nests of social insects (probably termites, as ants had not yet appeared) ; Volaticotherium was able to glide for short distances, like modern flying squirrels. The first multituberculates like Rugosodon evolved.

The Middle Jurassic spans from 175 to 163 million years ago. During this epoch, dinosaurs flourished as huge herds of sauropods, such as Brachiosaurus and Diplodocus, filled the fern prairies, chased by many new predators such as Allosaurus. Conifer forests made up a large portion of the forests. In the oceans, plesiosaurs were quite common, and ichthyosaurs flourished. This epoch was the peak of the reptiles. 

The Late Jurassic spans from 163 to 145 million years ago. During this epoch, the first avialans, like Archaeopteryx, evolved from small coelurosaurian dinosaurs. The increase in sea levels opened up the Atlantic seaway, which has grown continually larger until today. The further separation of the continents gave opportunity for the diversification of new dinosaurs.

Cretaceous
The Cretaceous is the longest period of the Mesozoic, but has only two epochs: Early and Late Cretaceous. 

The Early Cretaceous spans from 145 to 100 million years ago. The Early Cretaceous saw the expansion of seaways and a decline in diversity of sauropods, stegosaurs, and other high-browsing groups, with sauropods particularly scarce in North America.  Seasons came back into effect and the poles got seasonally colder, but some dinosaurs still inhabited the polar forests year round, such as Leaellynasaura and Muttaburrasaurus. The poles were too cold for crocodiles, and became the last stronghold for large amphibians like Koolasuchus. Pterosaurs got larger as genera like Tapejara and Ornithocheirus evolved. Mammals continued to expand their range: eutriconodonts produced fairly large, wolverine-like predators like Repenomamus and Gobiconodon, early therians began to expand into metatherians and eutherians, and cimolodont multituberculates went on to become common in the fossil record.

The Late Cretaceous spans from 100 to 66 million years ago. The Late Cretaceous featured a cooling trend that would continue in the Cenozoic Era. Eventually, tropics were restricted to the equator and areas beyond the tropic lines experienced extreme seasonal changes in weather. Dinosaurs still thrived, as new taxa such as Tyrannosaurus, Ankylosaurus, Triceratops and hadrosaurs dominated the food web. In the oceans, mosasaurs ruled, filling the role of the ichthyosaurs, which, after declining, had disappeared in the Cenomanian-Turonian boundary event. Though pliosaurs had gone extinct in the same event, long-necked plesiosaurs such as Elasmosaurus continued to thrive. Flowering plants, possibly appearing as far back as the Triassic, became truly dominant for the first time. Pterosaurs in the Late Cretaceous declined for poorly understood reasons, though this might be due to tendencies of the fossil record, as their diversity seems to be much higher than previously thought. Birds became increasingly common and diversified into a variety of enantiornithe and ornithurine forms. Though mostly small, marine hesperornithes became relatively large and flightless, adapted to life in the open sea. Metatherians and primitive eutherian also became common and even produced large and specialised genera like Didelphodon and Schowalteria. Still, the dominant mammals were multituberculates, cimolodonts in the north and gondwanatheres in the south. At the end of the Cretaceous, the Deccan traps and other volcanic eruptions were poisoning the atmosphere. As this continued, it is thought that a large meteor smashed into earth 66 million years ago, creating the Chicxulub Crater in an event known as the K-Pg Extinction (formerly K-T), the fifth and most recent mass extinction event, in which 75% of life became extinct, including all non-avian dinosaurs.

Paleogeography and tectonics
Compared to the vigorous convergent plate mountain-building of the late Paleozoic, Mesozoic tectonic deformation was comparatively mild. The sole major Mesozoic orogeny occurred in what is now the Arctic, creating the Innuitian orogeny, the Brooks Range, the Verkhoyansk and Cherskiy Ranges in Siberia, and the Khingan Mountains in Manchuria.

This orogeny was related to the opening of the Arctic Ocean and suturing of the North China and Siberian cratons to Asia. In contrast, the era featured the dramatic rifting of the supercontinent Pangaea, which gradually split into a northern continent, Laurasia, and a southern continent, Gondwana. This created the passive continental margin that characterizes most of the Atlantic coastline (such as along the U.S. East Coast) today.

By the end of the era, the continents had rifted into nearly their present forms, though not their present positions. Laurasia became North America and Eurasia, while Gondwana split into South America, Africa, Australia, Antarctica and the Indian subcontinent, which collided with the Asian plate during the Cenozoic, giving rise to the Himalayas.

Climate
The Triassic was generally dry, a trend that began in the late Carboniferous, and highly seasonal, especially in the interior of Pangaea. Low sea levels may have also exacerbated temperature extremes. With its high specific heat capacity, water acts as a temperature-stabilizing heat reservoir, and land areas near large bodies of water—especially oceans—experience less variation in temperature. Because much of Pangaea's land was distant from its shores, temperatures fluctuated greatly, and the interior probably included expansive deserts. Abundant red beds and evaporites such as halite support these conclusions, but some evidence suggests the generally dry climate of was punctuated by episodes of increased rainfall. The most important humid episodes were the Carnian Pluvial Event and one in the Rhaetian, a few million years before the Triassic–Jurassic extinction event.

Sea levels began to rise during the Jurassic, probably caused by an increase in seafloor spreading. Furthermore, Pangaea began to rift into smaller divisions, creating new shoreline around the Tethys Ocean. Temperatures continued to increase, then began to stabilize. Humidity also increased with the proximity of water, and deserts retreated.

The climate of the Cretaceous is less certain and more widely disputed. Probably, higher levels of carbon dioxide in the atmosphere are thought to have almost eliminated the north–south temperature gradient: temperatures were about the same across the planet, and about 10°C higher than today.  The circulation of oxygen to the deep ocean may also have been disrupted, preventing the decomposition of large volumes of organic matter, which was eventually deposited as "black shale".

Different studies have come to different conclusions about the amount of oxygen in the atmosphere during different parts of the Mesozoic, with some concluding oxygen levels were lower than the current level (about 21%) throughout the Mesozoic, some concluding they were lower in the Triassic and part of the Jurassic but higher in the Cretaceous, and some concluding they were higher throughout most or all of the Triassic, Jurassic and Cretaceous.

Life

Flora

The dominant land plant species of the time were gymnosperms, which are vascular, cone-bearing, non-flowering plants such as conifers that produce seeds without a coating. This contrasts with the earth's current flora, in which the dominant land plants in terms of number of species are angiosperms. The earliest members of the genus Ginkgo first appeared during the Middle Jurassic. This genus is represented today by a single species, Ginkgo biloba. The extant genus Sequoia is believed to have evolved in the Mesozoic. Bennettitales, an extinct group of gymnosperms with foliage superficially resembling that of cycads gained a global distribution during the Late Triassic, and represented one of the most common groups of Mesozoic seed plants.

Flowering plants radiated during the early Cretaceous, first in the tropics, but the even temperature gradient allowed them to spread toward the poles throughout the period. By the end of the Cretaceous, angiosperms dominated tree floras in many areas, although some evidence suggests that biomass was still dominated by cycads and ferns until after the Cretaceous–Paleogene extinction. Some plant species had distributions that were markedly different from succeeding periods; for example, the Schizeales, a fern order, were skewed to the Northern Hemisphere in the Mesozoic, but are now better represented in the Southern Hemisphere.

Fauna

The extinction of nearly all animal species at the end of the Permian Period allowed for the radiation of many new lifeforms.  In particular, the extinction of the large herbivorous pareiasaurs and carnivorous gorgonopsians left those ecological niches empty. Some were filled by the surviving cynodonts and dicynodonts, the latter of which subsequently became extinct.

Recent research indicates that it took much longer for the reestablishment of complex ecosystems with high biodiversity, complex food webs, and specialized animals in a variety of niches, beginning in the mid-Triassic 4 million to 6 million years after the extinction, and not fully proliferated until 30 million years after the extinction. Animal life was then dominated by various archosaurs: dinosaurs, pterosaurs, and aquatic reptiles such as ichthyosaurs, plesiosaurs, and mosasaurs.

The climatic changes of the late Jurassic and Cretaceous favored further adaptive radiation. The Jurassic was the height of archosaur diversity, and the first birds and eutherian mammals also appeared. Some have argued that insects diversified in symbiosis with angiosperms, because insect anatomy, especially the mouth parts, seems particularly well-suited for flowering plants. However, all major insect mouth parts preceded angiosperms, and insect diversification actually slowed when they arrived, so their anatomy originally must have been suited for some other purpose.

See also

References

British Mesozoic Fossils, 1983, The Natural History Museum, London.

External links
 Mesozoic (chronostratigraphy scale)

 
Geological eras